Lacalle is a surname. Notable people with the surname include:

Alfi Conteh-Lacalle (born 1985), Spanish–Sierra Leonean footballer
Andrés García La Calle (1909–1980), squadron leader of the 1st fighter squadron of the Spanish Republic and later Commander of all the fighter units of the Spanish Republican Air Force
Daniel Lacalle (born 1967), Spanish economist
Fernando Sáenz Lacalle (born 1932), the tenth Bishop and sixth Archbishop of San Salvador, El Salvador
Joseph LaCalle (1860–1937), clarinettist, composer, conductor and music critic
Luis Alberto Lacalle (born 1941), Uruguayan lawyer and politician who served as President of Uruguay from 1990 to 1995
Luis Alberto Lacalle Pou (born 1973), Uruguayan lawyer and politician, current President of Uruguay since March 2020

See also
La Calle (disambiguation)
López de Lacalle